Hubert Gordon Hopkirk (20 April 1884 – 1966) was a British actor of the silent era. He was born in Jena, Germany to British parents and began his film career in the late 1910s. After a series of films in Britain, he went to the United States to appear in Hollywood films before returning to Britain. Hopkirk never married. Later in life he converted to Buddhism and resided in Bangkok, Thailand. He died in a car accident at the age of 72.

Selected filmography
 Sybil (1921)
 The Skipper's Wooing (1922)
 The Wandering Jew (1923)
 Love, Life and Laughter (1923)
 White Slippers (1924)
 The Notorious Mrs. Carrick (1924)
 The Island of Despair (1926)
 A Woman Redeemed (1927)

References

External links

1884 births
1966 deaths
British male silent film actors
20th-century British male actors
Place of death missing
English Buddhists
Converts to Buddhism
British expatriates in Thailand
Road incident deaths in Thailand
Date of death missing
British expatriates in Germany